Charlottetown City Hall is the seat of City Council in Charlottetown, Prince Edward Island, Canada. It is located at 199 Queen Street at the corner of Kent Street.

It was designed by architects John Lemuel Phillips and Charles Benjamin Chappell in the Romanesque Revival style. It was built by contractor William H. Fraser beginning in 1887 and was completed in 1888. The fire hall designed by Charles Benjamin Chappell and John Marshall Hunter opened in 1916.

It was designated as a National Historic Site of Canada on November 23, 1984.

References

External links
City of Charlottetown - Official website

Buildings and structures in Charlottetown
Government buildings completed in 1888
City and town halls in Canada
Romanesque Revival architecture in Canada
Buildings and structures on the National Historic Sites of Canada register
National Historic Sites in Prince Edward Island